Adeline Jay Geo-Karis Illinois Beach State Park, part of the Illinois state park system, is located along Lake Michigan in northern Lake County in northeast Illinois. Together with lands to the north, including Chiwaukee Prairie, it forms the Chiwaukee Prairie Illinois Beach Lake Plain, an internationally recognized wet-land of importance under the Ramsar Convention. In 2010, it was renamed for former state senator Adeline Geo-Karis.

Recreational activities at the park include boating, swimming, hiking, bicycling, camping, bird watching, and picnicking. Known primarily for the beach, the park also includes dune areas, wetlands, prairie, and black oak savanna. The area at the far southern end of the park is a designated nature preserve, which was named a National Natural Landmark in 1980.

History
The park was gradually created starting in 1948 when the state acquired the first parcels. The northern unit, acquired between 1971 and 1982, was previously an Illinois National Guard training facility known as Camp Logan, Illinois. During the American Civil War, Camp Logan was a Union prisoner of war camp.

In 1958, the Illinois Beach Hotel was opened within the park.

Geology 
The park is located in the 12 mile long Zion Beach Ridge Plain. The Zion Beach Ridge Plain is 3,700 years old and composed of curvilinear ridge-and-swale topography. The beach ridges support black oak savanna habitat, while wetlands dominate the swales. The Zion Beach Ridge Plain has been migrating south throughout the late Holocene: the northern portion of the beach ridge erodes; freed sediment is then transported through the dominantly southward littoral drift and deposited on the southern portion of the beach ridge. This erosion and subsequent accretion process created the characteristically curved ridges and swales of the park as the complex migrates south. The northern unit of Illinois Beach State Park experiences rapid rates of erosion, which was exacerbated by the construction of North Point Marina in 1989 and reaches highs of 60 ft per year. The southward migration of the beach ridge plain has been disrupted by the construction of Waukegan Harbor. Erosion in the north unit of the park is exacerbated during periods of high lake level. As Lake Michigan has entered a period near record high lake levels since 2014, the park is experiencing rapid transgression of the shoreline.

Access
The entry to the beach is usually from a parking area on its north side: north of this carpark is usually the most crowded area in the summer time. South, the beach is less crowded and a mile of shoreline extends to an inlet into a wetland. Depending on weather conditions this inlet may be blocked by a berm from the lake waters, and again depending on weather conditions the water inside the berm may be significantly warmer than Lake Michigan which is rather cold until August.

Gallery

See Also
List of Ramsar sites in the United States

References

External links

Trails at Illinois Beach State Park

Beaches of Illinois
State parks of Illinois
Protected areas of Lake County, Illinois
National Natural Landmarks in Illinois
Protected areas established in 1948
Landforms of Lake County, Illinois
Ramsar sites in the United States